Lady Clara Elizabeth Iris Paget (born 12 September 1988) is a British actress and model known for her roles in films St Trinian's 2: The Legend of Fritton's Gold and Fast & Furious 6, and her role as Anne Bonny in the television series Black Sails.

Biography
Paget was born to an aristocratic father, Charles Paget, 8th Marquess of Anglesey, and Georgeanne Elliot Downes, who worked as a writer and painter.

Paget married Oscar Tuttiett in July 2021.

Career
Paget was first offered a role after being spotted by a talent scout at a costume party. During the years of 2014-17, the television series Black Sails was filmed in South Africa, and Paget received praise for her role as Anne Bonny, a fictionalised representation of the historical female pirate. 

Paget has worked as a model for fashion houses such as for Burberry during 2016. Paget has also been interviewed by various magazines such as Sheer, Vanity Fair (magazine) and Tatler. She has also made numerous appearances for the websites of British Vogue and Vogue Italia.

Paget has established herself as an It girl and is considered a B list celebrity, and she often attends award ceremonies and red carpet events-

Paget is involved with the charity "Project 0".

Filmography

Television

See also
 Marquess of Anglesey

References

External links

21st-century British actresses
1988 births
Living people
Place of birth missing (living people)
British film actresses
British television actresses
British female models
British socialites
Daughters of British marquesses
Clara